The Antiquities Act of 1906, is an act that was passed by the United States Congress and signed into law by Theodore Roosevelt on June 8, 1906. This law gives the President of the United States the authority to, by presidential proclamation, create national monuments from federal lands to protect significant natural, cultural, or scientific features. The Act has been used more than a hundred times since its enactment.

History
The Antiquities Act was signed into law by President Theodore Roosevelt during his second term in office. The act resulted from concerns about protecting mostly prehistoric Native American ruins and artifacts -- collectively termed "antiquities" -- on federal lands in the West, such as at Chaco Canyon, New Mexico. Removal of artifacts from these lands by private collectors, "pot hunters," had become a serious problem by the end of the 19th century. In 1902, Iowa Congressman John F. Lacey, who chaired the House Committee on the Public Lands, traveled to the Southwest with the rising anthropologist Edgar Lee Hewett, to see for himself the extent of the pot hunters' impact.  His findings, supported by an exhaustive report by Hewett to Congress detailing the archaeological resources of the region, provided the necessary impetus for the passage of the legislation.

The Act failed to deter purposeful, criminal looting at these protected sites and was deemed too vague, resulting in passage of the Archaeological Resources Protection Act of 1979. The Antiquities Act has been praised by several groups for its ability to protect important sites, including The Wilderness Society, the National Parks Conservation Association, The Pew Charitable Trusts, and the National Trust for Historic Preservation. 

Since the Antiquities Act became law, all but four presidents, Richard Nixon, Gerald Ford, Ronald Reagan, and George H.W. Bush, have chosen to enlarge or dedicate new national monuments. President Obama established more monuments than any president before him, with 26. The previous record was held by President Theodore Roosevelt with 18 monuments.  

On April 26, 2017, President Donald Trump signed Executive Order 13792 directing a review of the law and its uses.

Uses
The Act was intended to allow the President to set aside certain valuable public natural areas as park and conservation land. The 1906 act stated that it was intended for: "... the protection of objects of historic and scientific interest." These areas are given the title of "national monuments."  It also allows the President to reserve or accept private lands for that purpose.  The aim is to protect all historic and prehistoric sites on United States federal lands and to prohibit excavation or destruction of these antiquities.  With this act, this can be done much more quickly than going through the Congressional process of creating a national park.  The Act states that areas of the monuments are to be confined to the smallest area compatible with the proper care and management of the objects to be protected.

The United States Supreme Court has repeatedly upheld presidential proclamations under the Antiquities Act, ruling each time that the Act gives the president nearly-unfettered discretion as to the nature of the object to be protected and the size of the area reserved.

Some areas designated as national monuments have later been converted into national parks, or incorporated into existing national parks. 28 of the 63 national parks include areas originally designated as national monuments.

The first use of the Act protected a large geographic feature – President Theodore Roosevelt proclaimed Devils Tower National Monument on September 24, 1906. President Roosevelt also used it to create the Grand Canyon National Monument (now Grand Canyon National Park).

At , Papahānaumokuākea Marine National Monument is the largest protected area proclaimed.  George W. Bush signed proclamation Proclamation 8031 to establish the monument on June 15, 2006.

The smallest, Father Millet Cross National Monument (now part of a state park), was a mere .

For any excavation, the Act requires that a permit (Antiquities Permit) be obtained from the Secretary of the department which has jurisdiction over those lands.

Reduction of powers
Presidential powers under the Act have been reduced twice.  The first time followed the controversial proclamation of Jackson Hole National Monument in 1943. The 1950 law that incorporated Jackson Hole into an enlarged Grand Teton National Park also amended the Antiquities Act, requiring Congressional consent for any future creation or enlargement of National Monuments in Wyoming.

The second time followed Jimmy Carter's use of the Act to create  of national monuments in Alaska.

The Trump administration, conducted a review of 27 major designations to consider changes and Trump subsequently significantly reduced the size of Grand Staircase–Escalante National Monument and Bears Ears National Monument in Utah in 2017. The legality of these actions was challenged in federal court, and President Biden restored the original areas in 2021. Although some presidents have chosen to ignore the tradition of preservation of notable environmental or historic areas, no president to date has entirely undone a predecessor's monument.  

Several Supreme Court cases have upheld the president's ability to proclaim large areas under the Act. The first was a unanimous decision in 1920 that upheld the creation of Grand Canyon National Monument.

See also
 List of National Monuments of the United States
 National Park Service

References

External links

 National Monument Facts and Figures – National Park Service
 Chronological list of uses of the Antiquities Act and related actions from NPS
 The Story of the Antiquities Act, by Ronald F. Lee
 The Monumental Legacy of the Antiquities Act of 1906 – Mark Squillace, University of Colorado Law School
 Archeology.org
 Richard West Sellars, "A Very Large Array: Early Federal Historic Preservation--The Antiquities Act, Mesa Verde, and the National Park Service Act"(background and legislative history) published by the University of New Mexico School of Law, 2007
 The Antiquities Act: A Century of American Archaeology, Historic Preservation, and Nature Conservation, ed. by David Harmon, Frank P. McManamon, and Dwight T. Pitcaithley
The Highs and Lows of the Antiquities Act
 National Monuments and the Antiquities Act – Congressional Research Service
The Proclamation of National Monuments Under the Antiquities Act, 1906-1970

1906 in law
1906 in the environment
1906 in the United States
Progressive Era in the United States
United States federal environmental legislation
United States federal public land legislation
National Park Service